38 Cancri is a variable star in the zodiac constellation Cancer, located around 607 light years from the Sun. This object has the variable star designation BT Cancri; 38 Cancri is the Flamsteed designation. It is a member of the Praesepe cluster but is a challenge to view with the naked eye, having an apparent visual magnitude of 6.65. The star is moving closer to the Earth with a heliocentric radial velocity of +32 km/s.

This is an evolving subgiant star with a stellar classification of F0 IV. It was found to be a pulsating variable by Michel Breger in 1970 and is classed as a Delta Scuti variable. The star displays a pattern of variation showing up to 22 different frequencies, with three being dominant. The brightness varies by up to 0.07 in magnitude. It has 1.8 times the mass of the Sun and 1.8 times the Sun's radius. The star is radiating 59 times the Sun's luminosity from its photosphere at an effective temperature of around 7,300 K.

References

F-type subgiants
Delta Scuti variables
Cancer (constellation)
Durchmusterung objects
Cancri, 38
073575
042485
Cancri, BT